The call letters WNKJ may represent:

 WNKJ (FM) (89.3 MHz): a Christian radio station in Hopkinsville, Kentucky, United States
 WNKJ-TV (channel 51): a television station in Hopkinsville, Kentucky, United States that existed from 1983 to 1985